Barbara Risman is Professor and Head of Sociology at the University of Illinois at Chicago.

Early life and education

Barbara J. Risman was born on 20 July 1956 in Lynn, Massachusetts to an immigrant Jewish family. Risman's grandparents fled antisemitism in Europe and immigrated to the United States in the early 20th century. She grew up in a multi-generational extended family home with grandparents, aunts, and cousins as well as her parents and three siblings. An early experience of sexual discrimination occurred at her bat mitzvah in 1968. At that time, only boys were permitted to read from the Torah. Professor Risman has been interested in gender inequality ever since that first “click.” She earned her bachelor's degree in Sociology and Women's Studies from Northwestern University in 1976, and her Ph.D. in Sociology from the University of Washington in 1983.

Academic career 

Professor Risman joined the Department of Sociology at North Carolina State University (NCSU) in 1984. She was also the founding director of the NCSU Women's Studies program from 1989 to 1993. In 2006, she became Professor and Head of the Department of Sociology at the University of Illinois at Chicago. She has been a Visiting Professor at the University of Pennsylvania, the University of Trento in Italy, and the Free University in Amsterdam. Professor Risman was elected as vice-president of the American Sociological Association. From January - March 2018 she was a Fellow of the Institute of Advanced Study based at Durham University, and affiliated with St Mary's College.

Organizations 

Currently, she is president of the Board of the Council of Contemporary Families, a non-profit, non-partisan organization of family scholars and practitioners dedicated to providing the press and public with the latest research and best-practice findings about families. She has also served as co-chair and executive director of the Council on Contemporary Families, president of Sociologists for Women in Society, and a member of the Executive Council of the American Sociological Association. She was the president (2015-2016) of the Southern Sociological Society.

Gender as a social structure 

A major career contribution is Risman's theory of gender as a social structure. Her book, Gender Vertigo: American Families in Transition (1998, Yale University Press) is an early presentation of this theory. In this monograph, Risman introduces a theoretical framework that conceptualizes gender as a social structure, comprising three distinct but interlocking levels – individual, interactional, and institutional. Risman argues that it is the recursive relationship between all three levels that constructs and perpetuates gender inequalities in society. The monograph includes research on single fathers as parents, how baby boom women balance work and family, and egalitarian couples.

In her forthcoming book, Professor Risman traces the history of ideas and development of the use of gender in sociological theory and analysis. She then offers her own feminist theory of gender as a social structure. This is a major revision of her argument about how social change towards gender equality might effectively occur with far more attention to cultural issues. The book provides elaboration of how gender is constructed and sometimes deconstructed at the individual, interactional and institutional levels. She illustrates the use of efficacy of her theoretical argument with three different research studies: The first study is based on life history interviews with young people ages 18 and 30 about the meaning of gender in their lives. The second study is based on a major national survey of college students, as well as nearly 100 interviews with University of Illinois at Chicago (UIC) students about sexuality. The third study is an analysis of the effectiveness of major federal grants to universities to do "gender transformation" projects; the data are based on a meta-analysis of new research and an analysis of both quantitative climate surveys and interviews with people involved in the project at the UIC. The book concludes with a utopian vision for a society that has moved beyond gender.

Influence on gender studies 

Numerous studies have drawn on Professor Risman's theoretical framework of gender as a social structure. These include, but are not limited to, analyses of double standards in hooking up, men's talk about home cooking, involvement in gay and lesbian rights activism, sexual violence on college campuses, the “ex-gay” movement, gendered migration, the division of housework and child care, and how society can move toward greater gender equality.

Awards 
Barbara Risman's numerous awards include the Sociologists for Women in Society (SWS) Feminist Lecturer Award in 2003, the Southern Sociological Society Katherine Belle-Boone Jocher Award for lifetime contributions to the study of gender in 2005, the SWS Feminist Mentoring Award in 2007, and the American Sociological Association Award for the Public Understanding of Sociology in 2011. Most recently, she was named among the "100 Women that Mattered" at North Carolina State University.

Selected bibliography

Books 
 
 
 
  Second edition forthcoming in 2014.

Journal articles

References 

1956 births
American sociologists
American women academics
Living people
North Carolina State University faculty
Northwestern University alumni
People from Lynn, Massachusetts
University of Illinois Chicago faculty
University of Washington College of Arts and Sciences alumni
American women sociologists
20th-century American Jews
Jewish feminists
Fellows of the Institute of Advanced Study (Durham)
21st-century American Jews
20th-century American women
21st-century American women